The Tsai–Wu failure criterion is a phenomenological material failure theory which is widely used for anisotropic composite materials which have different strengths in tension and compression. The Tsai-Wu criterion predicts failure when the failure index in a laminate reaches 1. This failure criterion is a specialization of the general quadratic failure criterion proposed by Gol'denblat and Kopnov and can be expressed in the form

The stresses  are expressed in Voigt notation. If the failure surface is to be closed and convex, the interaction terms  must satisfy

which implies that all the  terms must be positive.

Tsai–Wu failure criterion for orthotropic materials 
For orthotropic materials with three planes of symmetry oriented with the coordinate directions, if we assume that  and that there is no coupling between the normal and shear stress terms (and between the shear terms), the general form of the Tsai–Wu failure criterion reduces to

Let the failure strength in uniaxial tension and compression in the three directions of anisotropy be . Then the coefficients of the orthotropic Tsai–Wu failure criterion are

The coefficients  can be determined using equibiaxial tests. If the failure strengths in equibiaxial tension are  then

The near impossibility of performing these equibiaxial tests has led to there being a severe lack of experimental data on the parameters .

It can be shown that the Tsai-Wu criterion is a particular case of the generalized Hill yield criterion.

Tsai-Wu failure criterion for transversely isotropic materials 
For a transversely isotropic material, if the plane of isotropy is 1–2, then

Then the Tsai–Wu failure criterion reduces to

where . This theory is applicable to a unidirectional composite lamina where the fiber direction is in the '3'-direction.

In order to maintain closed and ellipsoidal failure surfaces for all stress states, Tsai and Wu also proposed stability conditions which take the following form for transversely isotropic materials

Tsai–Wu failure criterion in plane stress 

The strengths in the expressions for  may be interpreted, in the case of a lamina, as
 = transverse compressive strength,  = transverse tensile strength,  = longitudinal compressive strength,  = longitudinal strength,  = longitudinal shear strength,  = transverse shear strength.

Tsai–Wu criterion for foams 
The Tsai–Wu criterion for closed cell PVC foams under plane strain conditions may be expressed as
 
where

For DIAB Divinycell H250 PVC foam (density 250 kg/cu.m.), the values of the strengths are MPa, MPa, MPa, MPa.

For aluminum foams in plane stress, a simplified form of the Tsai–Wu criterion may be used if we assume that the tensile and compressive failure strengths are the same and that there are no shear effects on the failure strength. This criterion may be written as 

where

Tsai–Wu criterion for bone 
The Tsai–Wu failure criterion has also been applied to trabecular bone/cancellous bone with varying degrees of success. The quantity  has been shown to have a nonlinear dependence on the density of the bone.

See also 
Material failure theory
Yield (engineering)

References 
yes

Engineering failures
Plasticity (physics)
Solid mechanics
Mechanics